Séguédine is a town in central eastern Niger, lying at the far northern tip of the Kaouar escarpment, an inhabited oasis in the midst of the Sahara Desert.  It is a Commune of Bilma Department, Agadez Region.

While isolated in modern Niger, it once lay on the important central soudan route of the Trans-Saharan trade which linked coastal Libya and the Fezzan to the Kanem-Bornu Empire near Lake Chad.  Its population is made up primarily of traditionally sedentary Kanuri people, as well as semi-nomadic Tuareg and Tubu people.

References 

Samuel Decalo. Historical Dictionary of Niger.  Scarecrow Press, London and New Jersey (1979). 
Jolijn Geels. Niger. Bradt London and Globe Pequot New York (2006). .

External links 
 GoogleMaps

Sahara
Populated places in Niger
Oases of Niger